The 1973 Plymouth City Council election took place on 7 June 1973 to elect members of Plymouth City Council in England. This was on the same day as other local elections. Voting took place across 22 wards, each electing 3 Councillors. Following the Local Government Act 1972, this was the first election to the new non-metropolitan district council for Plymouth, which came into being on 1 April the following year. The Conservative Party took control of the Council after winning a majority of seats.

Overall results

|-
| colspan=2 style="text-align: right; margin-right: 1em" | Total
| style="text-align: right;" | 66
| colspan=5 |
| style="text-align: right;" | 60,424
| style="text-align: right;" |

Ward results

Compton (3 seats)

Crownhill (3 seats)

Drake (3 seats)

Efford (3 seats)

Ernesettle (3 seats)

Ford (3 seats)

Honicknowle (3 seats)

Mount Gould (3 seats)

Pennycross (3 seats)

Plympton Erle (3 seats)

Plympton St Mary (3 seats)

Plymstock Dunstone (3 seats)

Plymstock Radford (3 seats)

St Andrew (3 seats)

St Aubyn (3 seats)

St Budeax (3 seats)

St Peter (3 seats)

Stoke (3 seats)

Sutton (3 seats)

Tamerton (3 seats)

Trelawny (3 seats)

Whitleigh (3 seats)

References

1973 English local elections
June 1973 events in the United Kingdom
1973
1970s in Devon